List of Philippine Super Liga awards for indoor volleyball.

Most Valuable Player

Women's

Men's

First Best Outside Spiker

Women's

Men's

Second Best Outside Spiker

Women's

Men's

First Middle Blocker

Women's

Men's

Second Middle Blocker

Women's

Men's

First Best Opposite Spiker

Women's

Men's

Second Best Opposite Spiker

Women's

First Best Setter

Women's

Men's

Second Best Setter

Women's

Best Libero

Women's

1st Best Libero

2nd Best Libero

Men's

Best Scorer

Women's

NOTE 1: Best scorer in a match (41 points)
NOTE 2: Best scorer in a match (56 points)

References

Philippine Super Liga awards
Philippine Super Liga